Kyle Edward Bekker (born September 2, 1990) is a Canadian professional soccer midfielder and team captain for Forge FC of the Canadian Premier League.

Club career

Youth
Bekker was born in Oakville, Ontario and began his youth soccer career with the Oakville Blue Stars, winning back-to-back Ontario Cup Championships in 2004 and 2005 and a National Championship in 2004. In 2006, he moved onto the Mississauga Dixie Dominators, where he won the Ontario Cup in 2006 and 2007 adding another National Championship in 2006. In 2007, he also played with Sigma FC, where in March of that year, his team played eight matches in the Netherlands against professional youth academies. His time over there earned him a trial with Ajax's youth academy, which ended up lasting six weeks until his inability to receive a European work permit led to his return to Canada.

At 18, helped Sigma FC climb the ranks for the Ontario Soccer League Men's Divisions. Over his four years in the OSL, Bekker scored 28 goals and registered 35 assists. He played with former Toronto FC teammate Emery Welshman during this period.

Bekker eventually received interest from colleges in the United States before accepting a scholarship to attend Boston College. During his four years there, Bekker played in 80 games, starting, with 17 goals and 22 assists. He picked up several awards on his way, including ACC All-Freshman-Team in 2009, and ACC All-First-Team in 2011 and 2012.

Bekker trained with Toronto FC during the summer of 2011, and then trained with Montreal Impact and Seattle Sounders in the Summer of 2012. He had a trial with Crystal Palace in December 2012, before work permit issues led to signing a pro contract with MLS and entering the MLS Draft.

Toronto FC
Bekker signed a contract with MLS on January 6, 2013. He was drafted third overall in the 2013 MLS SuperDraft by Toronto FC on January 17, 2013. Bekker made his debut for Toronto on March 2, in a 1–0 away defeat to Vancouver Whitecaps FC.

FC Dallas
On January 21, 2015, Bekker was transferred to FC Dallas. He made his debut for Dallas as a substitute for Fabian Castillo on March 14 in a 3–1 victory against Sporting Kansas City.

Montreal Impact
On July 16, 2015, Bekker was traded to Montreal Impact in exchange for Bakary Soumare. Bekker was released by Montreal on December 9, 2016.

San Francisco Deltas
After four seasons in MLS, Bekker signed with the San Francisco Deltas of the NASL. In their inaugural season, the club won the Soccer Bowl, but ceased operations three days after winning the title, leaving Bekker to look for a new club.

North Carolina FC
Bekker signed with USL side North Carolina FC on February 6, 2018.

Bekker has appeared on the Raleigh City Sports podcast twice. The first recording went missing which has been called "The Lost Tapes of Raleigh"

Forge FC
In November 2018, Bekker joined Forge FC of the new Canadian Premier League. Bekker cited the desire of starting for a new club in a new league as motivation for the move. In April 2019, Bekker was named the first captain in team history. On April 27, 2019, he participated in the first ever game in Canadian Premier League history, as Forge hosted York9 FC and battled to a 1–1 draw. In the 2019 Canadian Premier League season, Forge finished as runners up in both the spring and fall seasons, qualifying for the 2019 Canadian Premier League Finals where they faced off against Cavalry FC over two legs. Forge won both games 1–0 to win the North Star Shield and become the first ever Canadian Premier League champions. Bekker played all four of Forge's games in the 2019 CONCACAF League, when they defeated Antigua GFC in the first round, but lost in the round of sixteen to Olimpia. Bekker finished the 2019 season with five assists, tied for first in the league with five other players. He scored four league goals, as well as one in the Canadian Championship.

During the 2020 season, Bekker captained Forge to a second consecutive league title. He recorded three goals and one assist in 11 games and was named CPL Player of the Year. Following the season, Bekker re-signed with Forge.

In the 2021 season, Bekker had an individually successful year. Across all competitions he contributed with 5 goals and 2 assists in 35 appearances. He was named to the CPL Team of the Week 6 times, and received his third straight nomination for CPL Player of the Year, though he did not win. For the first time, Forge failed to win the league championship, losing in the final to Pacific, despite their best performance ever in the CONCACAF League, reaching the semi-finals and qualifying for the 2022 CONCACAF Champions League.

Bekker remained with Forge for the 2022 season. On June 29, he became the first player in league history to play 100 games and was commemorated by the club for his dedication.

In March 2023, Bekker was officially re-signed by Forge, penning a multi-year deal.

International career
Bekker played in the 2012 CONCACAF Men's Olympic Qualifying Tournament. On January 18, 2013, he received his first call up by the Canada national team for friendlies against Denmark and United States. Bekker made his senior team debut as a starter against Denmark, the game ended in a 4–0 defeat. On June 27, 2013 Bekker was listed as a part of the confirmed 23-man squad for Colin Miller's Canada squad for 2013 CONCACAF Gold Cup.

Career statistics

Club

International

Honours

Club
San Francisco Deltas
 Soccer Bowl: 2017

Forge FC
Canadian Premier League: 2019, 2020, 2022

Individual
 Canadian Premier League Player of the Year: 2020

References

External links

1990 births
Living people
Association football midfielders
Canadian soccer players
Soccer people from Ontario
Sportspeople from Oakville, Ontario
Canadian expatriate soccer players
Expatriate soccer players in the United States
Canadian expatriate sportspeople in the United States
Boston College Eagles men's soccer players
Toronto FC draft picks
Toronto FC players
FC Dallas players
CF Montréal players
FC Montreal players
San Francisco Deltas players
North Carolina FC players
Forge FC players
Major League Soccer players
North American Soccer League players
USL Championship players
Canadian Premier League players
Canada men's under-23 international soccer players
Canada men's international soccer players
2013 CONCACAF Gold Cup players
2015 CONCACAF Gold Cup players
Sigma FC players